

Events

January events
 January 4 - Passenger service resumes on the Strasburg Rail Road in Pennsylvania for tourists.
 January 5 - Foulridge railway station closes on the Midland Railway (originally the Leeds and Bradford Extension Railway) in Lancashire, England.

February events
 February 28 - The Eastern Region of British Railways closes most of the former Midland and Great Northern Joint Railway.

March events
 March 28 - The Niagara, St. Catharines and Toronto Railway, the last interurban railroad in Canada, operates its last revenue service.

April events
 April 3 - Construction begins on Japanese National Railways’ Tōkaidō Shinkansen between Osaka and Tokyo.
 April 4 - Maine Central Railroad ends passenger service to Samoset destination hotel in Rockland, Maine.
 April 25 - Opening of the Saint Lawrence Seaway encourages improved ice-breaking on the Saint Lawrence River and initiates declining winter freight volume on Canadian railways east of Montreal.
 SAFEGE test monorail built in France.

May events
 May - The Ottawa, Arnprior and Parry Sound Railway runs its last train, ending 62 years of service.
 May 28 - A passenger train in Indonesia derails and falls into a ravine, killing 85 people and injuring 47 in the Tasikmalaya area of West Java; sabotage is suspected.

June events 
 June 9 - The Chicago, Aurora and Elgin Railroad, interurban railway serving Chicago's western suburbs, ceases freight operations, thus bringing an end to all of the railroad's operations.
 June 15 - The Disneyland Monorail System built by Alweg opens, making it the first daily operating monorail system in the western hemisphere.
 June 21 - Soo Line 2719 hauls the last of Soo Line Railroad's steam locomotive-powered trains in revenue service on a round-trip excursion between Minneapolis, Minnesota, and Ladysmith, Wisconsin.

July events
 July 1 - Colorado Railroad Museum opens in Golden.
 July 14 - Pennsylvania Railroad (PRR) 0-6-0 number 5244, class B-6sb, becomes the last steam locomotive to operate on the PRR.
 July 18 - The last steam locomotive runs on the Nickel Plate Road as a pair of 0-8-0 switchers are called out to cover a traffic surge.
 July 27 - Southern Pacific Company opens new embankment replacing Lucin Cutoff trestle across Great Salt Lake, Utah.

August events 
 August 25 - Baltimore and Ohio Railroad opens Arthur Kill Vertical Lift Bridge over Staten Island Sound in the United States.
 August 30 - Streetcar service in Montreal, Quebec, Canada is discontinued.

October events 
 October 6 - The Carmelit, Haifa's underground funicular railway, opens.
 October 12 - First R28 (New York City Subway car) enters service, from the last batch of passenger cars that the American Car and Foundry Company is to build.
 October 28 - The Canadian National Railway line between St. Felicien and Chibougamau, Quebec, opens.

November events 
 November 2 - The Pacific Electric Watts Line, then under operation by the Los Angeles Metropolitan Transit Authority, is discontinued. The service is replaced with buses.

December events
 December 1 - The Virginian Railway is merged into the Norfolk and Western Railroad.
 December 29 - First section of Lisbon Metro (Metropolitano de Lisboa) opens in Lisbon, Portugal, first metro (subway) system in the country.

Unknown date events
 General Electric announces that it will begin manufacturing diesel locomotives on its own.
 Israel Railways officially withdraws all steam locomotives; the last, Baldwin-built Palestine Railways H class 4-6-0 no. 901, surviving in traffic into the following year.

Accidents

Births

May births
 May 1 - Ning Bin, Chinese signalling control systems engineer (died 2019).

Deaths

August deaths
 August 26 - William Valentine Wood, President of the London, Midland and Scottish Railway 1941-8 (born 1883).

References 

 Colin Churcher's Railway Pages (August 16, 2005), Significant dates in Canadian railway history. Retrieved August 30 and October 28, 2005.